Darbast or Dar Bast may refer to:
 Darbast, Fars
 Darbast, Bashagard, Hormozgan Province
 Darbast, Bastak, Hormozgan Province
 Darbast 1, Kerman Province
 Darbast, Sistan and Baluchestan